Enrique Pinti (7 October 1939 – 27 March 2022) was an Argentine actor and comedian.

Life
As a humorist, he performed stand-up shows with long monologues on Argentine politics and history, speaking at an extremely fast pace and resorting to a mix of common swearwords and elaborate insults to qualify notorious examples of immorality or corruption. The monologues were interrupted by interspersed musical segments. Though his stance was not impartial or unbiased, Pinti displayed historical knowledge beyond the common traditional themes, so these shows were arguably an alternative source of learning about Argentina's past and present troubles. A number of his productions, such as Salsa Criolla in the early 1990s and later Candombe Nacional, were among the most successful in the Argentine theatre.

Pinti starred in a number of Argentine films, in satirical as well as tragic roles. Some of the most notable were in Carlos Galettini's Juan que reía (1976), Alejandro Doria's Esperando la carroza (1985), Eduardo Mignogna's Flop (1990), Alberto Lecchi's Perdido por perdido (1993), Carlos Saura's Tango (1998), and in María Victoria Menis' Arregui, la noticia del día (2001).

Pinti was hospitalized on 5 March 2022 in Buenos Aires due to complications of diabetes. He died on 27 March 2022 at the age of 82. At the time of his death, he also had depression caused by the COVID-19 pandemic in Argentina.

Theatre
Pan y Circo
Salsa Criolla
Recuerdos del Futuro
Circo Romano
El infierno del Pinti
Pericón.com.ar
Candombe nacional
Pingo Argentino
Hairspray
Antes de que me Olvide

Filmography
 Waiting for the Hearse
 
 
 
 
 Sentimental (requiem para un amigo)
 
 
 
 
 
 
 Tango, no me dejes nunca (1998)
 La Cara del ángel (1998)

TV series

References

External links

 
 Interview with Enrique Pinti - Diagonal 

1939 births
2022 deaths
Deaths from diabetes
Illustrious Citizens of Buenos Aires
Argentine people of Italian descent
Argentine male film actors
Argentine male stage actors
Argentine male telenovela actors
Argentine male television actors
Argentine musical theatre actors
Argentine male comedians
Argentine LGBT actors
Male actors from Buenos Aires